Sapphire Skies is a 2014 historical romance by Belinda Alexandra. It is about Lily, an Australian working in Moscow, who discovers the story behind Natalya Azarova, a night witch who disappeared during World War II.

Publication history
2014, Australia, HarperCollins 
2015, United Kingdom, Simon & Schuster Ltd

Reception
A reviewer for the Historical Novels Review wrote "This is a fascinating tale about the Soviet female pilots dubbed the “Night Witches” by the Germans and the horrific post-war years under Stalin’s iron fist that are rarely the topic of popular fiction.".

Sapphire Skies has also been reviewed by Good Reading magazine.

References

External links
Library holdings of Sapphire Skies

2014 Australian novels
Fiction set in the 1940s
Fiction set in the 2000s
Historical romance novels
Novels set in the Stalin era
HarperCollins books